Albert Gallatin Hawes (April 1, 1804 – March 14, 1849) was a U.S. Representative from Kentucky, brother of Richard Hawes, nephew of Aylett Hawes, granduncle of Harry Bartow Hawes, and cousin of Aylett Hawes Buckner.

Born near Bowling Green, Caroline County, Virginia, Hawes moved to Kentucky in 1810 with his parents, who settled in Fayette County near Lexington.  He pursued classical studies at Transylvania University, Lexington, Kentucky.  He moved to Hancock County and settled near Hawesville.  He engaged in agricultural pursuits and was a slaveholder.

Hawes was elected as a Jacksonian to the Twenty-second, Twenty-third, and Twenty-fourth Congresses (March 4, 1831 – March 3, 1837).  He served as chairman of the Committee on Expenditures in the Post Office Department (Twenty-second through Twenty-fourth Congresses).

After his term in Congress, Hawes resumed agricultural pursuits.  He moved to Daviess County and settled near Yelvington, Kentucky and continued agricultural pursuits.  He died near Yelvington, March 14, 1849.  He was interred in the Hawes family burial ground on the Owensboro and Yelvington Road.

References

Sources

1804 births
1849 deaths
Transylvania University alumni
People from Caroline County, Virginia
Jacksonian members of the United States House of Representatives from Kentucky
19th-century American politicians
Hawes family